The 2015 Big 12 Conference women's basketball tournament was the postseason women's basketball tournament for the Big 12 Conference, held from March 6 to 9 in Dallas, Texas, at the American Airlines Center.

Seeds

Schedule

Bracket

All-Tournament team
Most Outstanding Player – Nina Davis, Baylor

See also
2015 Big 12 Conference men's basketball tournament
2015 NCAA Women's Division I Basketball Tournament
2014–15 NCAA Division I women's basketball rankings

References

External links
 2015 Phillips 66 Big 12 Conference women's basketball tournament Official Website

Big 12 Conference women's basketball tournament
Basketball in the Dallas–Fort Worth metroplex
Tournament
Big 12 Conference women's basketball tournament
Big 12 Conference women's basketball tournament